The sixth season of Black-ish premiered on September 24, 2019 and concluded on May 5, 2020 on ABC in the United States. It is produced by Khalabo Ink Society, Cinema Gypsy Productions, Artists First and ABC Studios, with creator Kenya Barris, who also serves as executive producer alongside Anthony Anderson, Brian Dobbins, Jonathan Groff and Helen Sugland.

The series revolves around Dre, portrayed by Anthony Anderson, a family man who struggles with finding his cultural identity while raising his kids in a white neighborhood with his wife, Bow (Tracee Ellis Ross).


Cast

Main cast
 Anthony Anderson as Andre "Dre" Johnson
 Tracee Ellis Ross as Rainbow "Bow" Johnson
 Marcus Scribner as Andre ("Junior") Johnson Jr.
 Miles Brown as Jack Johnson
 Marsai Martin as Diane Johnson
 Peter Mackenzie as Leslie Stevens
 Deon Cole as Charlie Telphy
 Jenifer Lewis as Ruby Johnson
 Jeff Meacham as Josh Oppenhol

Recurring cast
 Laurence Fishburne as Earl "Pops" Johnson
 Yara Shahidi as Zoey Johnson
 Nelson Franklin as Connor Stevens
 Loretta Devine as Lynette
 Nicole Sullivan as Janine
 Wanda Sykes as Daphne Lido
 Catherine Reitman as Lucy
 Emerson Min as Mason
 Jennie Pierson as Ms. Davis
 Liz Jenkins as Ms. Biggs

Guest cast
 Baron Vaughn as Doug
 Golden Brooks as Malika
 Jill Marie Jones as Tina
 Persia White as Lila
 Reggie Hayes as Walter
 LaVar Ball as himself
 Bashir Salahuddin as Harold
 Diallo Riddle as Reggie
 Christine Horn as Shaline
 Raven-Symoné as Rhonda Johnson
 Steven Williams as Phillip
 Mercedez McDowell as Nicole
 Jill Scott as Yaya
 Anthony Alabi as Lewis
 Gillian Iliana Waters as Tanya
 Joel McHale as himself
 Eric Garcetti as Mayor Eric Garcetti
 Michael Jai White as Vincent
 Keith David as Loose Craig
 Glynn Turman as Billy Blade
 Matt Braunger as Jeremy
 Shondalia White as Erica
 Chloe Bailey as Jazz Forster
 Katlyn Nichol as Olivia Lockhart

Episodes

Ratings

References

2019 American television seasons
2020 American television seasons
Black-ish